Swivler is a manufacturer of snowboard bindings, snowboard binding rotating devices, LBEV (load bearing equipment vest), and accessories. The company is headquartered in Woodland, Washington.

Company overview

Swivler built a snowboard binding rotating device and other products that are marketed worldwide—mainly in North America, Europe, and Australia.

History
In 2002, Rick A. White invented a snowboard binding rotating device to minimize the torque force that occurs when a snowboarder has one foot out of the binding and one locked on the board. The rotating device allows the snowboarder to turn the locked foot straight into the direction of the tip of the snowboard without removing his boot from the boot binding. In 2004, the invention was first introduced on the SIA fare. In 2007, the rotating mechanism was implemented into a snowboard strap-in binding.

Technology
Rotatable binding conversion apparatus (US Patent 6,575,489 B1).

References

Sporting goods manufacturers of the United States
Clothing companies of the United States
Snowboarding companies
Privately held companies based in Washington (state)